Kundyz Kozhakhmet (born 4 March 1999) is a Kazakhstani footballer who plays as a defender for Women's Championship club FC Okzhetpes and the Kazakhstan women's national team.

Career
Kozhakhmet has been capped for the Kazakhstan national team, appearing for the team during the 2019 FIFA Women's World Cup qualifying cycle.

References

External links
 
 
 

1999 births
Living people
Kazakhstani women's footballers
Kazakhstan women's international footballers
Women's association football defenders